Let's Talk About It is the second album by American R&B singer Carl Thomas. It was released by Bad Boy Records  and Universal Records on March 23, 2004 in America. Originally scheduled for a November 18, 2003 release, the album was delayed several months due to Bad Boy entering into a new distribution deal with Universal Records.

The album debuted and peaked at number four on the US Billboard 200 and was later certified gold by the Recording Industry Association of America (RIAA). Promotion of Let's Talk About It was cut short due to Thomas' brother being gunned down several months after the album's release. The album was one of many albums released on Bad Boy Records that underperformed under the Universal distribution deal. As a result, Thomas left the label in 2005, while Bad Boy left Universal for a distribution deal with Atlantic Records in the same year.

Critical reception

Allmusic editor David Jeffries  rated the album three out of five stars. He found that Let's Talk About It "is a very different record from 2000's [debut] Emotional. It's more upbeat, slicker, and riskier. There are really two albums going on here: a moderate one that overcomes some workmanlike production with naughty and clever lyrics, and a meandering one that's warm, personal, and visionary [...] With 16 tracks and only a couple fluff ones, it's easy to whittle this album down to a tight, totally Thomas listen." Aliya S. King, writing for Vibe, gave the album a three and a half ouf of five stars rating.

Track listing

Notes
  Bonus track

Sample credits
"Let's Talk About It (Interlude)" contains a sample of "Standing Right Here" by Melba Moore.
"My First Love" contains an interpolation of "Money (Dollar Bill Y'all)" by Jimmy Spicer.
"She Is" contains a sample of "Happy" by Surface.
"But Me" contains a sample of "Over And Over Again" by Bob James.
"Let Me Know" contains an interpolation of "Love Is Blindness" by U2.
"The Way That You Do" contains a sample of "Woman's Blues" by Laura Nyro.

Charts

Weekly charts

Year-end charts

Certifications

References

2004 albums
Bad Boy Records albums
Carl Thomas (singer) albums
Albums produced by Ryan Leslie